Negus (Negeuce, Negoose) (cf.   ) is a title in the Ethiopian Semitic languages. It denotes a monarch, such as the Negus Bahri (king of the sea) of the Medri Bahri kingdom in pre-1890 Eritrea, and the Negus in pre-1974 Ethiopia. The negus is referred to as Al-Najashi (النجاشي) in the Islamic tradition.

Overview

Negus is a noun derived from the Ethiopian Semitic root  (neguess), meaning "to reign". The title has subsequently been used to translate the word "king" or "emperor" in Biblical and other literature. In more recent times, it was used as an honorific title bestowed on governors of the most important provinces (kingdoms): Gojjam, Begemder, Wollo, Tigray, the seaward kingdom (Bahre Negash "King of the Sea"), and later Shewa.

See also
 Emperor of Eritrea or Medri Bahri 
 Ras Woldemichael Solomon

References

Ethiopian nobility
Gubernatorial titles
Heads of state
Noble titles
Royal titles
Titles of national or ethnic leadership